Mondim de Basto is a municipality in the district of Vila Real in Portugal. The population in 2011 was 7,493, in an area of 172.08 km2.

The present Mayor is Bruno Ferreira, elected by the psd Party. The municipal holiday is July 25.

Parishes
Administratively, the municipality is divided into 6 civil parishes (freguesias):
 Atei
 Bilhó
 Campanhó e Paradança
 Ermelo e Pardelhas
 Mondim de Basto
 Vilar de Ferreiros

References

External links
 Municipality official website

Towns in Portugal
Municipalities of Vila Real District